Naruto Shippūden 3D: The New Era (known as Naruto Shippūden: Shinobi Rittai Emaki Saikyō Ninkai Kessen (ナルト- 疾風伝 忍立体絵巻!最強忍界決戦!) in Japan, and Naruto Shippuden: The New Era in Europe) is a video game developed by Tomy and published by 505 Games for Nintendo 3DS.  This title is the eighth and final installment of the Ninja Council series of Naruto videogames. The game was never released in North America.

Overview 
The game starts off with Naruto Uzumaki training on Mount Myōboku. Soon after his training, he is called back to Konoha by Kakashi Hatake. When he arrives, Naruto finds out that Tsunade has cancelled the pact with Sunagakure, and the hidden villages all seem to be about to go to war. The game features 2.5D graphics like its predecessors in the Ninja Council series.

Reception

The game was met with very mixed reception upon release, as GameRankings gave it a score of 51.17%, while Metacritic gave it 50 out of 100.

References

2011 video games
505 Games games
Action video games
Naruto video games
Nintendo 3DS games
Nintendo 3DS-only games
Side-scrolling video games
Video games developed in Japan